Fantômas is a 1920 American crime film serial directed by Edward Sedgwick. The film is considered to be lost.

Cast
 Edward Roseman as Fantômas
 Edna Murphy as Ruth Harrington
 Johnnie Walker as Jack Meredith
 Lionel Adams as Prof. James D. Harrington
 John Willard as Detective Fred Dixon
 Eve Balfour as The Woman in Black
 Rena Parker as The Countess
 Irving Brooks as The Duke
 Ben Walker as The Butler
 Henry Armetta as The Wop
 Rita Rogan

Chapter titles
On the Stroke of Nine
The Million Dollar Reward
The Triple Peril
Blades of Terror
Heights of Horror
The Altar of Sacrifice
Flames of Destruction
At Death's Door
The Haunted Hotel
The Fatal Card
The Phantom Sword
The Danger Signal
On the Count of Three
The Blazing Train
The Sacred Necklace
The Phantom Shadow
The Price of Fang Wu
Double-Crossed
The Hawk's Prey
The Hell Ship

See also
 List of film serials
 List of film serials by studio
 List of lost films

References

External links

 

1920 films
1920 crime films
1920 lost films
American silent serial films
American black-and-white films
American remakes of French films
American crime films
Fantômas films
Films directed by Edward Sedgwick
Lost American films
Lost crime films
1920s American films
American adventure films
Silent adventure films
Silent crime films